{{DISPLAYTITLE:C18H19N3O4}}
The molecular formula C18H19N3O4 (molar mass: 341.36 g/mol, exact mass: 341.1376 u) may refer to:

 L-655,708 (FG-8094)
 Nitroxazepine

Molecular formulas